The Tour de la Pharmacie Centrale is a cycling race held annually in Tunisia. It was part of UCI Africa Tour in category 2.2, held between 2006 and 2008, and then again in 2018.

Winners

References

Cycle races in Tunisia
2006 establishments in Tunisia
Recurring sporting events established in 2006
UCI Africa Tour races